Nazan Saatci (born June 22, 1958) is a Turkish actress. She is known for her performances in Tokatçi (1983), Ölümsüz (1982), and Hulchal (1985). She was the second runner-up in Miss Asia Pacific beauty pageant in 1983.

Early life and family 
Saatci was born on June 22, 1958, in Samsun, Turkey. She has a degree in Turkish linguistics and literature from the University of Istanbul. After her cinema career, she moved to California along with her family.

Career 
Saatci made her screen debut in Fakir (1979). Her first breakthrough as an actress was a Turkish TV play Tokatçi (1982). Her first Urdu movie Halchal was released on April 5, 1985 in Pakistani cinemas. From 1985 to 1988, she appeared in Lollywood movies Zanjeer, Manila ki bijliyan,Talash, and Badla. In 1995, she worked in an Iranian spy movie Playing with Death, filmed in Iran and Turkey.

Saatci was the second runner-up in Miss Europa 1978 (Unofficial Miss Europe 1978) which was held in Reggio Emilia, Italy. She was again the second runner-up in Miss Asia Pacific (1983) held in the Philippines and received the special award of "Miss Talent".

Spiritual beliefs 
Since 2008, Saatci became convinced that she had been experiencing one-to-one conversations with fairies. In 2011, she formed Fairy Voices, a non-profit organization, to share her spiritual experience. She claims to have some recorded fairy voices and images as evidence for an unseen fairy world.

Filmography

References

External links 
 Biography of Nazan at Fairy Voices

Living people
1958 births
20th-century Turkish actresses
Turkish television actresses
Women environmentalists
People from Samsun
Turkish women writers
Istanbul University people
Miss Asia Pacific International
Turkish expatriate actresses in Pakistan